Piano Concerto No. 5 in E-flat major may refer to:

 Piano Concerto No. 5 ("Emperor") (Beethoven)
 Piano Concerto No. 5 (Rubinstein)